Acanthobothrium bullardi is a species of parasitic onchobothriid tapeworm first found in the whiptail stingray, Dasyatis brevis, in the Gulf of California.  This species of parasitic tapeworm was originally discovered alongside four other varieties of tapeworms in the Gulf of California during a survey of the area that was done in the years 1993 as well as 1996.  Information on this discovery can be found in greater detail in the article written by Sohini Ghoshroy and J.N. Caira titled "Four New Species of Acanthobothrium (Cestoda: Tetraphyllidea) from the Whiptail Stingray Dasyatis Brevis in the Gulf of California, Mexico".  This article claims itself as the first document with record on these tapeworms in California.  Although this particular variety has only been discovered on the bodies of whiptail stingray, other Acanthobothrium species have been found on the bodies of many more animals including sharks. This is described in the article written by Caroline Fyler titled "Systematics, biogeography and character evolution in the tapeworm genus Acanthobothrium van Beneden, 1850 ".

Physical description

It is relatively small, possesses few segments, relatively few testes, and shows asymmetrical ovaries. It also differs from its cogenerate species by its hook size and length of its hook prongs; cirrus sac size; the position of its genital pore, the number of testes columns that are anterior to the cirrus sac; as well as a number of postvaginal testes. What makes Acanthobothrium bullardi different in comparison to other species of parasitic worms is that its genital pore is located more towards the front of the body rather than the back of it which is a common characteristic of other Acanthobothrium.

References

Further reading
Reyda, Florian B., and Janine N. Caira. "Five new species of Acanthobothrium (Cestoda: Tetraphyllidea) from Himantura uarnacoides (Myliobatiformes: Dasyatidae) in Malaysian Borneo." Comparative Parasitology 73.1 (2006): 49–71.
Maleki, Loghman, Masoumeh Malek, and Harry W. Palm. "Two new species of Acanthobothrium (Tetraphyllidea: Onchobothriidae) from Pastinachus cf. sephen (Myliobatiformes: Dasyatidae) from the Persian Gulf and Gulf of Oman." Folia parasitologica 60.5 (2013): 448–456.
List, Host-Parasite, and Parasite-Host List. "Bibliography database of living/fossil sharks, rays and chimaeras (Chondrichthyes: Elasmobranchii, Holocephali)."

External links

WORMS

Cestoda
Parasitic helminths of fish